"All Hell Breaks Loose" is the twenty-second episode and season finale of the third season of the American television series Charmed; it is also the 66th overall episode in the series. The episode was originally broadcast in the United States on May 17, 2001, on The WB. It was written by Brad Kern and directed by Shannen Doherty. As well as being Doherty's last episode as director, it was also her last appearance on the show as the character Prue Halliwell, although the character would later return in the comic book series. In the episode, The Charmed Ones deal with their secret of being witches going global and all of the news reporters swarming them.

Plot

Background
Charmed focuses on the three Halliwell sisters, Prue (Shannen Doherty), Piper (Holly Marie Combs) and Phoebe (Alyssa Milano), who are known as the most powerful good witches of all time in the supernatural community. They live their everyday lives battling demons and warlocks in modern-day San Francisco, while still trying to have a normal life. This episode focuses on their secret of being witches coming out into the public, when Prue and Piper are caught on tape vanquishing the demon Shax (Michael Bailey Smith).

Episode

Prue, Piper and Phoebe rush into the manor with Dr. Griffiths (Matt Malloy), and they argue that Phoebe did not give them enough time to figure out why Shax, the personal assassin of The Source of All Evil, is after Dr. Griffiths. Phoebe goes up to the attic to the Book of Shadows to find out more information about Shax, and Piper tells her not to get side tracked by saving her demon boyfriend Cole (Julian McMahon). While Prue is explaining what is happening to Dr. Griffiths, she feels a slight breeze, and Shax rushes in the form of a tornado. Just as he is about to attack Dr. Griffiths, Prue jumps in the way and is thrown into a wall by a gust of wind. When Piper gets up, she is then thrown into the same wall, and Phoebe comes rushing down the stairs and says the vanquishing spell which wounds Shax. She then calls for Leo who orbs in and heals Prue and Piper just in time. Prue and Piper then go into the streets to figure out where Shax went. While talking in the middle of the street, Shax appears and attacks the two of them, but Piper blows him up. Thinking he is dead, both Prue and Piper are confused because if there is a spell in the book, they normally need it. But what Prue and Piper do not realize is that there was a camera crew, filming for the news, and they caught it all on tape. Back at the manor, Prue and Phoebe explain everything to Dr. Griffiths about magic, and why he needs to keep their secret, and he promises that he will keep it safe, since they saved his life. Prue is still very suspicious about how Shax died, though Piper tells her that he went poof and screamed which is how most demons die. Since Prue still worries, she sends Leo (Brian Krause) to The Elders to find out if they vanquished Shax for good. Phoebe then confesses that she is going to The Underworld to save Cole. When she arrives, Cole tells her that she should not have come and puts his hands around her neck.

At the news station, Elana (Mercedes Colón) shows her crew what she caught on tape, of Prue and Piper vanquishing Shax, and some of her co-workers shoot down her idea that it was not real, though she convinces them to air it. Prue and Piper go back to the street where they vanquished Shax, and Prue tells her that she has a bad feeling about how they vanquished him. When Darryl (Dorian Gregory) brings a suspect into the station, his Captain (Redmond Hicks) shows him the news feed, and he calls Piper and Prue to tell them that they have been exposed. Darryl arrives at the manor, and tells them that they could be arrested because they killed someone on live television. Piper admits that she knew they should not have followed Shax into the street, and Darryl tells Prue and Piper that his Captain wants them down at the station. Leo then orbs in telling them The Elders do not know how to fix magic being exposed. When Prue asks Leo to take them to the hospital, he tells her that The Elders are not allowing Whitelighters to orb because they could be exposed too. Down in The Underworld, Cole confesses to Phoebe that he is now evil, and that she needs to go, but Phoebe tells him that she can save him and their love can conquer anything. When Phoebe smashes a potion on Cole's back, he kisses her, showing that the spell he was put under has broken. Phoebe then asks Cole to come back to the manor, but he says that if he were to go back there, demons would always go after him. Back at the hospital, Prue and Piper arrive to take Dr. Griffiths back to the manor for his safety. Shax then appears in a tornado, knocking Dr. Griffiths out of the car, and Prue and Piper say the vanquishing spell which wounds Shax. However, they did not know that the news crew followed them to the hospital and taped them vanquishing Shax again.

The manor is then swarmed by helicopters, police officers, protesters, and news reporters. When Prue turns on the television, she finds Dr. Griffiths on the news telling reporters everything that happened when they first saved him. Prue and Piper then call Leo for help, and Leo tells them that they need to contact the demon Tempus to reverse time. Piper says that they vanquished Tempus, but Leo tells her that he was never vanquished and was just defeated. In the middle of their conversation, a crazed Wiccan fanatic named Alice (Marianna Elliott) breaks into the manor, telling Prue and Piper that she wants to join their coven; however, Prue throws her out of the manor. Leo then goes to The Underworld to tell Cole and Phoebe what has happened above ground and asks Cole if he can get Tempus to reverse time. When Cole tells Leo that he cannot summon Tempus, Phoebe says that he should ask The Source (Michael Bailey Smith), since the demonic side of magic has been exposed too. The Source then tells Cole that if Tempus was to reverse time, it would destroy him, but The Source says that he will do it if Phoebe agrees to join the dark side because it is the only way to save one of her sisters from dying.

Back at the manor, Prue and Piper barricade the doors, and Prue confesses to Piper that she is scared. When Prue tells Piper about what could happen, she hears a gunshot. When she looks down at Piper, she sees that Piper has been shot from a rifle used by the crazed Wiccan fanatic Alice. Prue then rushes to her car with Piper in her arms and cries out for Leo. She realizes that she has to drive to the hospital because Leo is in The Underworld and he cannot hear her calling. When several people block the driveway, Prue telekinetically sends them flying through the air. When she arrives at the hospital, Dr. Griffiths and his team race to save Piper's life. Despite all their efforts, Piper dies and a grief-stricken Prue orders all of the doctors to get out of the room. In The Underworld, Cole comes back from seeing The Source and tells Leo and Phoebe about the proposal because it is the only way to save one of her sisters. Back at the hospital, the SWAT team arrive, and Prue still furious about losing Piper, uses her powers and fighting skills against them, and locks herself in the room, just as Leo orbs in to see his wife has died. He then orbs back to The Underworld to confirm that Piper was the sister that died, and Phoebe agrees to stay in The Underworld to save Piper's life. Cole then tells The Source, but when he leaves, The Source tells his hit-man to kill Phoebe and detain Cole. Just as the SWAT team are about to shoot Prue, time is reversed to the sisters' first encounter with Shax at the manor. With Phoebe trapped in The Underworld, Shax is able to kill Dr. Griffiths by sending him through a window, and Prue and Piper are left for dead.

Production

Reception

Ratings
The episode achieved 5.3 million viewers upon its original broadcast on May 17, 2001.

Critical response
In 2014, Gavin Hetherington of SpoilerTV reviewed the episode as part of a Throwback Thursday special on the site on October 30. Hetherington looked back at the season three finale fondly, calling it a "season finale done right" and commented that "[t]he third season finale of Charmed had everything in it, brimming with excitement and destruction, spelling the end of one of television's most influential witches." Of Prue's death, he said it was "one of the best in television history". He ended the review by saying the episode "was incredible, from start to finish".

References

2001 American television episodes
Charmed (TV series) episodes
Television episodes about murder